Oleg Anatol'evich Matveychev (Russian: Олег Анатольевич Матвейчев, born 1 February 1970) is a Russian politician, political consultant and spin doctor for the Kremlin. He is currently a professor at Financial University under the Government of the Russian Federation in Moscow and has published various books on politics and public relations. He is one of the most popular Russian bloggers.

Career
In 1993 Matveychev graduated in philosophy from the Ural State University. He then completed a PhD in the philosophy of politics and law with the thesis topic of Philosophy of Hegel's Politics and Modernity. From 1996 he became an active political consultant for Russian regional elections and participated in over 60 campaigns. From 2007 to 2020 he was professor of National Research University – Higher School of Economics.

Politics
From 2006 to 2010 Matveychev was a staff member of Presidential Administration of Russia. In 2010 he became deputy governor of the Vologda Oblast. In 2011 he became deputy governor of the Volgograd Oblast. In 2021 Matveychev was elected as a member of the 8th Russian State Duma.

Controversy
In 2010, according to the Guardian newspaper, Matveychev caused controversy by writing on his blog that "he dreamed of gathering the Russian opposition on a city square and calling in an army of tanks to mow them down. 'And then, like after Tiananmen in China, we would also have 10% annual economic growth after 20 or 30 years'".

Matveychev is an opponent of copyright. He was involved in at least two plagiarism scandals, where Matveychev was the one whose writings were plagiarized, once by Anna Chapman, and a second time by the Russian Minister of Culture Vladimir Medinsky in his book "Myths about Russia", particularly in the chapter about "unwashed Europe" and "clean Russia". Matveychev had announced that he is not going to pursue any action as the copyright impedes innovation and "behind every thought or object is every human being who ever lived".

Matveychev is an author of an alternative theory about the ending of the Trojan War, with the Trojans as winners.

Additionally, Matveychev was behind the idea to change the name of a real person to Harry Potter to participate in Yekaterinburg regional elections.

Alaska Comments 
During the 2022 Russian invasion of Ukraine, Matveychev made a series of demands directed towards the United States and NATO. He proposed a list of various demands for once the invasion succeeded, including that the US immediately end all sanctions against Russia and in order to aid their economic recovery, return the State of Alaska, and Fort Ross, California, both of which were historically Russian territories voluntarily given up during the 19th century. He also demanded that the continent of Antarctica be recognized as Russian territory, citing that it was discovered by Russian explorers. His proposition was widely mocked and condemned on social media, notably by Mike Dunleavy, the Governor of Alaska, who stated, "Good luck with that! Not if we have something to say about it."

Books
Political Consulting in Russia: yesterday, today, tomorrow, 2020
Austrian engineering philosophy for polytechnics, co-author, 2019
Hyperborea - Adventures of an Idea, co-author, 2018 
Solzhenitsyn's Vatnik, co-author, 2018 
Myths About Corruption, co-author, 2018 
Practical Sophism: Prohibited Methods, co-author, 2018 
Modern Myths About Russia, co-author, 2018 
Russia and China. Two strongholds. Past, Present, Prospects , co-author, 2017 
Information wars of the 21st century. "Soft power" against the atomic bomb, 2016 
Crimean Spring. 30 days that shook the world, co-author, 2014
Trojan Horse of Western History, co-author, 2013 (translated to English)
Ears that Wag the Ass - Modern Social Programming, 2002, 2008, 2013
Imperative Mood of History, 2012
Russia, What to Do? Breakthrough Strategies of the New Millenium, 2011
American Lard, fiction, co-author, 2009
The sum of political technologies, 2008The Sovereignty of Spirit, 2007The Big Current Political Encyclopedia , 2007, co-authorAnti-psychology. The modern man in search of meaning, co-author, 2004China at the Junction of the Milleniums, 2004Electoral campaign - Practice Against Theory, 2001Political оntologies , 2001Problems of manipulation, 1999What is political consulting?, 1998

 On the question of the historicity of the Trojan War, 2017
 Russian Thought on the Origination of Greek Philosophy, 2017Anacharsis." A wise man, because the Scythian, 2016Towards a discussion about the origins of the ancient Greek philosophy in Russian and Soviet philosophical thought, 2016About approaches of studying the ancient Greek sophistry, 2016The Seven Wonders of the Hyperborean Abaris, 2016Famirid. The Blind Philosopher, the Inventor of Music, 2016Orpheus: a phenomenon from the North (asking the question), 2015The Aristotle's concept of" slavery", 2013The origin of the anthropomorphism in Greek religion, 2013Public relations of the modern school: working with target audiences. The handbook for the educational refresher training program  "School management based on communicative technologies", 2002 The study guide on the history of modern Western philosophy", 2002''

Charity work
Matveychev is on the board of "Right to Smile", a children's charity set up by ex-spy Anna Chapman, active in her hometown of Volgograd.

References

External links
Personal website

Politics of Volgograd Oblast
Politics of Vologda Oblast
Russian public relations people
Russian politicians
1970 births
Living people
Russian bloggers
Academic staff of the Higher School of Economics
Ural State University alumni
Eighth convocation members of the State Duma (Russian Federation)